Lana Antonova (born November 18, 1976) is a Russian actress and businesswoman based in Los Angeles.

Life and career 
Antonova was born and raised in Kuybyshev, Russia, Soviet Union (present-day Saratov). At the age of 16, she left Russia and moved to Melbourne, Australia. She graduated from the University of Melbourne with a degree in Accounting and Finance.

Antonova began her acting career in 1995 when she starred in the soap opera Neighbours. She subsequently moved to Los Angeles to advance her acting career.

She's mainly known for her film appearances which include Austin Powers: International Man of Mystery, Fire Down Below (1997) The Face of the Serpent (2003), The World's Fastest Indian, Eulogy, Detective (TV Movie), Slipstream alongside Anthony Hopkins, Jane Doe: Eye of the Beholder (TV Movie), Eavesdrop.

She's also had guest roles on TV shows including on L.A. Heat, Medical Investigation and Suits.

Personal life 
In 2005, Antonova married Christopher Lawford, the nephew of John F. Kennedy. The couple divorced in 2009.

References 

Russian film actresses
Russian women in business
1976 births
Living people